Cyril William Hurcomb, 1st Baron Hurcomb  (18 February 1883 – 7 August 1975) was a British civil servant.

Career
Hurcomb was Permanent Under-Secretary of the Ministry of Transport from 1927 to 1937; of the Ministry of Shipping from 1939; and then of its successor the Ministry of War Transport from 1941 until 1947. He was the first chairman of the British Transport Commission between 1948 and 1953. He was also a keen ornithologist and conservationist, and played a key role in the 1954 Protection of Birds Act. He served as chairman of the Royal Society for the Protection of Birds' council, as president of the RSPB, and president of the West Midland Bird Club from 1960 to 1975 (when he was succeeded by his son-in-law, Tony Norris, the husband of his daughter Cicely Hurcomb (d. 1976). In July 1950 he was elevated to the peerage as Baron Hurcomb, of Campden Hill in the Royal Borough of Kensington. He was also a Grand Officer of the Order of the Crown (Belgium) and Grand Cross of the Order of St. Olav. The BR Standard Class 7 locomotive number 70001 was named Lord Hurcomb in his honour.

Personal life
Lord Hurcomb died in August 1975, aged 92; the barony became extinct.

Bibliography
 Hurcomb wrote the foreword.

References

1883 births
1975 deaths
British ornithologists

Knights Grand Cross of the Order of the Bath
Knights Commander of the Order of the British Empire
Grand Officers of the Order of the Crown (Belgium)
Royal Society for the Protection of Birds people
British Transport Commission
20th-century British zoologists
Barons created by George VI